Hiduj (also Romanized as Hīdūj, Hīdach, and Hiduch; also known as Hīdūj-e Bālā (Persian: هیدوج بالا) – meaning "Upper Hiduj" – also Romanized as Īdoj-e Bālā; the spelling Hindugeh is also known) is a city in and the capital of Hiduj District, in Sib and Suran County, Sistan and Baluchestan Province, Iran. At the 2006 census, its population was 1,065, in 217 families.

References

Sib and Suran County

Cities in Sistan and Baluchestan Province